Stéphane De Groodt (born 3 March 1966) is a Belgian comedian, humorist and former racing driver.

Life and career

Early life and education 
Stéphane De Groodt is the son of an engineer at Texaco and a housewife who takes care of handicapped children in foundations. Dyslexic, he has a chaotic scholarity, which already translates his wills to play comedy. He did not obtain any graduation and decided to become a comedian as well as a racing driver. His parents offered him a racing driver suit and a helmet.

He then went through several small jobs, including barman, journalist, marketing assistant, editor and advertiser, while entering little by little the field of the competition. He learned to become a comedian in the evening on stage while dedicating the weekends to auto racing.

Auto racing career 
While cooking meal to sell it at restaurants, Stéphane De Groodt paid the auto racing school of La Châtre near Châteauroux where he met the Belgian racing driver Eric van de Poele. He was a professional racing driver from 1985 to 2000, and rose to fame especially with Formula Renault, Formula 3000, Porsche Supercup at the 2001 Spa 24 Hours, and even at the BMW M1 Procar Championship in which he received the title of Champion of Belgium in BMW Compact Cup. In 2000, he left the auto racing competition to become a full-time comedian.

Television and radio career 
Stéphane De Groodt created the series File dans ta chambre, broadcast since 14 January 2002 on channels RTBF, Canal+ Belgique and France 2, and in which the texts are co-written by his wife Odile d'Oultremont. The series are small episodes in which he portrays Lucien, a totally uncultivated father attempting to answer the questions asked by his 10-year-old son Clovis about a definition or an expression. At the end of every episode, his son answers that he thought it meant something else, which is in fact the real sense of the definition or meaning of the expression. After that, the father does not believe his son and orders him to go to his room, which is the reference to the title of the series.

In September 2012, Stéphane De Groodt features every Sunday on the program Le Supplément on Canal+ with Maïtena Biraben, in which he presents a column of a few minutes titled Retour vers le futur. This column functions the same way than the one he presented until 2012 on the program La Matinale on Canal+ and also with Maïtena Biraben and Caroline Roux, where he talked about his meeting with famous characters with a humoristic tune and a mixture of word plays and puns. He also presented a courrier des téléspectateurs (French for "mail of the viewers"), imaginary and funny. He pursued this column weekly on RTL with Stéphane Bern  on the radio program À la bonne heure where he comments a fake mail of improbable auditors.

In September 2013, after having left RTL, he joined France Inter on the radio program Comme on nous parle with Pascale Clark every Thursday, where he presents a column of a few minutes titled Mes mails, in which he comments a number of fake E-mails of auditors addressed to France Inter and Pascale Clark.

Acting career 
Stéphane De Groodt began his acting career playing a number of roles in many television series such as Faux Contact and a recurring role in the French crime series Boulevard du Palais from 1999 to 2007. He then played supporting roles in a number of minor films, but also in well-known films like Asterix at the Olympic Games (2008) and Asterix and Obelix: God Save Britannia (2012). In 2010, he replaced Serge Hazanavicius for the role of the veterinary François Kleber in the series Mes amis, mes amours, mes emmerdes... at the beginning of the second season. In 2013, he played a guest role in the sixth and seventh season of series Fais pas ci, fais pas ça, in which French actress Frédérique Bel also had a recurring role since the fourth season.

He then played a more important role in the choral comedy Barbecue (2014) alongside Franck Dubosc and Florence Foresti. In 2015, he played his first main role in the comedy-drama Paris-Willouby with Isabelle Carré. Two years later, he played one of the main roles in the romantic comedy L'Un das l'autre (2017) alongside Louise Bourgoin. In 2018, he returns playing in the team comedy Nothing to Hide, which was one of the biggest film successes of the year with nearly 2 million viewers, and in which he played alongside Bérénice Bejo and the former Miss Météo Doria Tillier.

Personal life 
Stéphane De Groodt married in 2014 the novelist and screenwriter Odile d'Oultremont, with whom he has been in couple since 2000. They are now separated, but after having co-written together the series File dans ta chambre broadcast on France 2, they have still been collaborating.

Style 
Stéphane De Groodt and his very literary surreal humour which include the unbridled rhythm of word plays make him often think about other famous humorists such as Raymond Devos and Pierre Desproges, which often causes the complete misunderstanding of some of his special guests.

Filmography 
Film
Mauvais Genres (2001) ... Pryzuski
Trois petites filles (2004) ... inspector
Casablanca Driver (2004) ... patient
Pour le plaisir (2004) ... café owner
25 degrés en hiver (2004) ... working inspector
Saint-Jacques... La Mecque (2005) ... priest of Navarrenx
Asterix at the Olympic Games (2008) ... Numéric
Baby blues (2008) ... Sacha
Une chaîne pour deux (2008)
Le Siffleur (2010) ... Martial
Sans laisser de traces (2010) ... Kazinski
Asterix and Obelix: God Save Britannia (2012) ... stadium decurion
Chez nous c'est trois ! (2013) ... Gabriel
Barbecue (2014) ... Alexandre
Do Not Disturb (2014) ... Pavel
Les Gazelles (2014) ... M. Hublot
Paris-Willouby (2015) ... Maurice Guilby
Fanny's Journey (2016) ... Jean
Chacun sa vie et son intime conviction (2017)
Nothing to Hide (2018) ... Vincent
The Butcher's Daughter (2021) ... Miguel Amestoy
Bigbug (2022) ... Max

Television
Faux Contact (1997–2000) ... adjutant Stéphane Coelenbier
Boulevard du Palais (1999–2007) ... Pascal Jagot (season 1 to 9)
Joséphine, ange gardien (Episode : "La vérité en face") (2002) ... The receptionist
Mon voisin du dessus (TV film) (2003) ... Rémi
Mon vrai père (TV film) (2004) ... Alain Perini
Petit Homme (TV film) (2005) ... Grégoire
Je hais les vacances (TV film) (2007) ... Étienne
Vive les vacances ! (2009) ... Christophe
Joséphine, ange gardien (Episode : "Police Blues") (2009) ... Commander Levasseur
Tombé sur la tête (2010) ... Bertrand
35 kilos d'espoir (2010) ... Marc
Mes amis, mes amours, mes emmerdes... (2010) ... François Kleber
Merci patron (TV film) (2011) ... François
Le Sang de la vigne (2013) ... Cluzel (1 episode)
Fais pas ci, fais pas ça (2013) ... Pierre-Henri Delage (season 6)

Publications

References

External links 

 

Belgian racing drivers
International Formula 3000 drivers
Porsche Supercup drivers
24 Hours of Spa drivers
Belgian male actors
Belgian male comedians
1966 births
Male actors from Brussels
Living people
FIA GT Championship drivers
24 Hours of Daytona drivers
Belgian male television actors
Belgian male film actors
20th-century Belgian male actors
21st-century Belgian male actors
Racing drivers from Brussels